City of Mukilteo was a steam ferry built in 1927 which served on Puget Sound until April 1932, when the ferry was destroyed by fire.

Career
City of Mukilteo was built in 1927 by the Marine Construction Co. of Seattle for the Puget Sound Navigation Company (PSN).  PSN placed the ferry on routes out of Mukilteo, with stops on Whidbey Island.
In 1929 the City of Mukilteo was one of 19 automobile ferries owned by PSN, of a total fleet of 29 vessels.
In April 1932 the ferry was destroyed by fire.

Notes

References 
 City of Mukilteo, a steam ferry, at sea University of Washington digital image 550–1, with historical notes prepared by the Puget Sound Maritime Historical Society.
 Kline, M.S., and Bayless, G.A., Ferryboats -- A legend on Puget Sound, Bayless Books, Seattle, WA 1983 
 Newell, Gordon R., ed., H.W. McCurdy Marine History of the Pacific Northwest,  Superior Publishing Co., Seattle, WA (1966)
 Newell, Gordon R., Ships of the Inland Sea, Superior Publishing Co., Seattle, WA (2nd Ed. 1960)

1927 ships
Steamboats of Washington (state)
Steam ferries of Washington (state)
Ships built in Seattle
Puget Sound Navigation Company